In mathematics, a stiff equation is a differential equation for which certain numerical methods for solving the equation are numerically unstable, unless the step size is taken to be extremely small. It has proven difficult to formulate a precise definition of stiffness, but the main idea is that the equation includes some terms that can lead to rapid variation in the solution.

When integrating a differential equation numerically, one would expect the requisite step size to be relatively small in a region where the solution curve displays much variation and to be relatively large where the solution curve straightens out to approach a line with slope nearly zero.  For some problems this is not the case.  In order for a numerical method to give a reliable solution to the differential system sometimes the step size is required to be at an unacceptably small level in a region where the solution curve is very smooth. The phenomenon is known as stiffness.  In some cases there may be two different problems with the same solution, yet one is not stiff and the other is.  The phenomenon cannot therefore be a property of the exact solution, since this is the same for both problems, and must be a property of the differential system itself. Such systems are thus known as stiff systems.

Motivating example 

Consider the initial value problem

The exact solution (shown in cyan) is

We seek a numerical solution that exhibits the same behavior.

The figure (right) illustrates the numerical issues for various numerical integrators applied on the equation.

One of the most prominent examples of the stiff ordinary differential equations (ODEs) is a system that describes the chemical reaction of Robertson:

If one treats this system on a short interval, for example,  there is no problem in numerical integration. However, if the interval is very large (1011 say), then many standard codes fail to integrate it correctly.

Additional examples are the sets of ODEs resulting from the temporal integration of large chemical reaction mechanisms. Here, the stiffness arises from the coexistence of very slow and very fast reactions. To solve them, the software packages KPP and Autochem can be used.

Stiffness ratio 
Consider the linear constant coefficient inhomogeneous system

The general solution of  takes the form

Now let us suppose that

which implies that each of the terms
	
	the term  will decay monotonically if  is real and sinusoidally if  is complex.

Interpreting  to be time (as it often is in physical problems),  is called the transient solution and  the steady-state solution. If  is large, then the corresponding term  will decay quickly as  increases and is thus called a fast transient; if
 is small, the corresponding term
 decays slowly and is called a slow transient.  Let  be defined by

so that  is the fastest transient and  the slowest.  We now define the stiffness ratio as

Characterization of stiffness 
In this section we consider various aspects of the phenomenon of stiffness.  "Phenomenon" is probably a more appropriate word than "property", since the latter rather implies that stiffness can be defined in precise mathematical terms; it turns out not to be possible to do this in a satisfactory manner, even for the restricted class of linear constant coefficient systems.  We shall also see several qualitative statements that can be (and mostly have been) made in an attempt to encapsulate the notion of stiffness, and state what is probably the most satisfactory of these as a "definition" of stiffness.

J. D. Lambert defines stiffness as follows:

 If a numerical method with a finite region of absolute stability, applied to a system with any initial conditions, is forced to use in a certain interval of integration a step length which is excessively small in relation to the smoothness of the exact solution in that interval, then the system is said to be stiff in that interval. 

There are other characteristics which are exhibited by many examples of stiff problems, but for each there are counterexamples, so these characteristics do not make good definitions of stiffness.  Nonetheless, definitions based upon  these characteristics are in common use by some authors and are good clues as to the presence of stiffness.  Lambert refers to these as "statements" rather than definitions, for the aforementioned reasons.  A few of these are:
  A linear constant coefficient system is stiff if all of its eigenvalues have negative real part and the stiffness ratio is large.
  Stiffness occurs when stability requirements, rather than those of accuracy, constrain the step length.
 Stiffness occurs when some components of the solution decay much more rapidly than others.

Etymology 
The origin of the term "stiffness" has not been clearly established.  According to Joseph Oakland Hirschfelder, the term "stiff" is used because such systems correspond to tight coupling between the driver and driven in servomechanisms.
According to Richard. L. Burden and J. Douglas Faires,

 Significant difficulties can occur when standard numerical techniques are applied to approximate the solution of a differential equation when the exact solution contains terms of the form , where  is a complex number with negative real part.
. . .
Problems involving rapidly decaying transient solutions occur naturally in a wide variety of applications, including the study of spring and damping systems, the analysis of control systems, and problems in chemical kinetics.  These are all examples of a class of problems called stiff (mathematical stiffness) systems of differential equations, due to their application in analyzing the motion of spring and mass systems having large spring constants (physical stiffness). 
For example, the initial value problem

and has eigenvalues .  Both eigenvalues have negative real part and the stiffness ratio is

which is fairly large.  System then certainly satisfies statements 1 and 3.  Here the spring constant  is large and the damping constant  is even larger. (while "large" is not a clearly-defined term, but the larger the above quantities are, the more pronounced will be the effect of stiffness.)

Equation  behaves quite similarly to a simple exponential , but the presence of the  term, even with a small coefficient, is enough to make the numerical computation very sensitive to step size. Stable integration of  requires a very small step size until well into the smooth part of the solution curve, resulting in an error much smaller than required for accuracy.  Thus the system also satisfies statement 2 and Lambert's definition.

A-stability 

This solution approaches zero as  when  If the numerical method also exhibits this behaviour (for a fixed step size), then the method is said to be A-stable. A numerical method that is L-stable (see below) has the stronger property that the solution approaches zero in a single step as the step size goes to infinity. A-stable methods do not exhibit the instability problems as described in the motivating example.

Runge–Kutta methods 
Runge–Kutta methods applied to the test equation  take the form , and, by induction, . The function  is called the stability function. This motivates the definition of the region of absolute stability (sometimes referred to simply as stability region), which is the set . The method is A-stable if the region of absolute stability contains the set , that is, the left half plane.

Example: The Euler methods 

Consider the Euler methods above. The explicit Euler method applied to the test equation  is
 
The region of absolute stability for this method is thus  which is the disk depicted on the right. The Euler method is not A-stable.

The motivating example had . Indeed, the numerical results do not converge to zero. However, with step size , we have  which is just inside the stability region and the numerical results converge to zero, albeit rather slowly.

Example: Trapezoidal method 

Consider the trapezoidal method

when applied to the test equation , is

Solving for  yields

Thus, the stability function is

and the region of absolute stability is

This region contains the left half-plane, so the trapezoidal method is A-stable. In fact, the stability region is identical to the left half-plane, and thus the numerical solution of  converges to zero if and only if the exact solution does. The trapezoidal method is A-stable but not L-stable. The implicit Euler method is an example of an L-stable method.

General theory 

where  denotes the vector with all ones. This is a rational function (one polynomial divided by another).

Explicit Runge–Kutta methods have a strictly lower triangular coefficient matrix  and thus, their stability function is a polynomial. It follows that explicit Runge–Kutta methods cannot be A-stable.

The stability function of implicit Runge–Kutta methods is often analyzed using order stars. The order star for a method with stability function  is defined to be the set . A method is A-stable if and only if its stability function has no poles in the left-hand plane and its order star contains no purely imaginary numbers.

Multistep methods 
Linear multistep methods have the form

Applied to the test equation, they become

which can be simplified to

where . This is a linear recurrence relation. The method is A-stable if all solutions  of the recurrence relation converge to zero when . The characteristic polynomial is

All solutions converge to zero for a given value of  if all solutions  of  lie in the unit circle.

The region of absolute stability for a multistep method of the above form is then the set of all  for which all  such that  satisfy . Again, if this set contains the left half-plane, the multi-step method is said to be A-stable.

Example: The second-order Adams–Bashforth method 

Let us determine the region of absolute stability for the two-step Adams–Bashforth method
 
The characteristic polynomial is
 
which has roots
 
thus the region of absolute stability is
 
This region is shown on the right. It does not include all the left half-plane (in fact it only includes the real axis between ) so the Adams–Bashforth method is not A-stable.

General theory 
Explicit multistep methods can never be A-stable, just like explicit Runge–Kutta methods. Implicit multistep methods can only be A-stable if their order is at most 2. The latter result is known as the second Dahlquist barrier; it restricts the usefulness of linear multistep methods for stiff equations. An example of a second-order A-stable method is the trapezoidal rule mentioned above, which can also be considered as a linear multistep method.

See also
 Backward differentiation formula, a family of implicit methods especially used for the solution of stiff differential equations
 Condition number
 Differential inclusion, an extension of the notion of differential equation that allows discontinuities, in part as way to sidestep some stiffness issues
 Explicit and implicit methods

Notes

References 
 .
 .
 .
 .
 .
 .
 .
 .
 .
 .
 .
 .
.

 .
 .
Stability of Runge-Kutta Methods

External links 
 An Introduction to Physically Based Modeling: Energy Functions and Stiffness
 Stiff systems Lawrence F. Shampine and Skip Thompson Scholarpedia, 2(3):2855.	doi:10.4249/scholarpedia.2855

Numerical differential equations